The Moosalp (el. 2048 m.) is a high mountain pass across the western Pennine Alps, connecting Bürchen with Törbel in the canton of Valais in Switzerland.

The pass lies north-east of Augstbordhorn.

See also
 List of highest paved roads in Europe
 List of mountain passes

References 
Swissgeo.ch

Mountain passes of Valais
Mountain passes of the Alps